Roon may refer to:

People
Albrecht von Roon (1803–1879), Prussian  soldier and politician

Ships
 , a German armored cruiser of World War I
 SS Roon, a German passenger steamship launched in 1902 operated by Norddeutscher Lloyd
 , German ship class
 Roon-class aircraft carrier, a proposed German ship class based on the conversion of

Other
 Roon, a fictional planet in the Star Wars franchise